Pigem is a surname. Notable people with the surname include:

Carlos Pigem (born 1990), Spanish golfer
Carme Pigem (born 1962), Spanish architect
Jordi Pigem (born 1964), Spanish philosopher and writer